Rubus cuneifolius, the sand blackberry, is a North American species of flowering plant in the rose family. It occurs in the eastern United States in every coastal state from Louisiana to New Hampshire, with the exception of Rhode Island. There are also reports of inland populations in Tennessee, Arkansas, and Oklahoma, and the species has become an invasive species in South Africa.

The genetics of Rubus is extremely complex, so that it is difficult to decide on which groups should be recognized as species. There are many rare species with limited ranges such as this. Further study is suggested to clarify the taxonomy.

References

External links
 Carolina Nature
 Digital Atlas of the Virginia Flora
 Atlas of Florida Vascular Plants
 

cuneifolius
Flora of the Eastern United States
Plants described in 1813
Taxa named by Frederick Traugott Pursh